The episodes of the Hellsing anime series premiered on Fuji Television on October 10, 2001, and ran for thirteen episodes until its conclusion on January 16, 2002. Produced by Gonzo, directed by Umanosuke Iida and written by Chiaki J. Konaka, the episodes are based on the characters and settings of the Hellsing manga series by Kouta Hirano but lead through a different story. The episodes as a whole detail the works of the Hellsing Organization, a secret anti-paranormal unit under the command of Sir Integra Wingates Hellsing, and its various operatives including the vampire Alucard and his fledgling partner, ex-policewoman Seras Victoria.

The series is licensed for English language release in North America by Geneon Entertainment, in the United Kingdom by ADV Films (although it is no longer licensed since the closure of the company) and in Australia by Madman Entertainment. Geneon's English dub of the series aired in the United States on Starz!'s Encore Action channel from October 4 to December 27, 2003.

Satelight and Geneon Entertainment began production of an original video animation (OVA) series in 2006. Entitled as simply Hellsing in Japan, and Hellsing Ultimate internationally, the OVA episodes more closely follow the source manga and differ from the first series with the divergence of the former based on the latter's episode 5 and 6 as the source manga had not been completed by the time Gonzo produced the TV series. In addition, the Ultimate series includes The Major and his Millennium officers as the main antagonists.  The first fifty-minute episode was released to Region 2 DVD in Japan on February 10, 2006, with eight episodes released, and two more announced as of August 2011. It is licensed for release in the United States by Geneon USA, with the first episode released on December 5, 2006. Geneon USA stopped self-distribution of its titles in 2007, but remains the series' licensor with Funimation Entertainment taking over its North American distribution of the episodes. Funimation released the fourth episode and re-released the first three episodes on September 23, 2008. In 2010 Funimation Entertainment announced that they have licensed three of the new OVA episodes 5-7 & the original TV series and in 2011 have licensed episodes 1-4 & 8 and these will be released in the USA starting in 2012. In 2014, Hellsing Ultimate aired on US television via Adult Swim's Toonami programming block, starting on September 13. Initially, there were difficulties securing the broadcast rights to the final two episodes, leading to the show to initially be pulled after episode 8 but the rights were eventually cleared up in time to air episodes 9 and 10 a month later in December.

Two pieces of theme music are used for the first Hellsing anime series. "Logos Naki World" (meaning "World without rationality") by Yasushi Ishii is used as the opening theme while Mr. Big's "Shine" is used for the ending theme. For the OVA episodes, the ending of each episode features various instrumental pieces composed by Hayato Matsuo and performed by the Warsaw Philharmonic Orchestra all the way up to OVA Volume V.  OVA VI and VII both feature vocal ending themes performed by Japanese rock group Suilen, including their song "Magnolia" for OVA VI, and "Shinto-Shite" for OVA VII.

Episode list

Hellsing (2001–02)

Hellsing Ultimate (2006–14)

Hellsing: The Dawn

References 

Hellsing
Episodes